Fresh Aire 4 is the fourth album in new age musical group Mannheim Steamroller's Fresh Aire series.  The album was originally released in 1981. Each of the first four Fresh Aire albums is based on a season; Fresh Aire 4s theme is Winter. The entire album was mixed and recorded digitally and was also one of the first CDs released.

"Red Wine," a re-arrangement of the traditional folk song, "Greensleeves", is a sign of the group's successful Christmas albums to come. The track "Embers" is a slower, reflective reworking of the spritely "Saras Band" from the first Fresh Aire.

Track listing
"G Major Toccata" – 5:06
"Crystal" – 4:21
"Interlude 7" – 3:04
"Four Rows of Jacks" – 3:13
"Red Wine" (traditional) – 4:20
"Dancing Flames" – 6:56
"The Dream" – 3:11
"Embers" – 3:22
 All tracks composed by Chip Davis except where noted.

Personnel
Chip Davis – drums, percussion, recorders, synthesizer
Jackson Berkey – Davis harpsichord, Baldwin SD-10 piano, Yamaha electric grand, celeste, pipe organ (109 rank Aeolian-Skinner), Fender Rhodes, synthesizer
Eric Hansen – lute, bass guitar
Steve Shipps, Hugh Brown, Dorothy Brown, Joe Landes, Merton Shatzkin, James Hammond, Sue Robinson, Mort Alpert, Chris Farber, Lou Newman, Miriam Duffelmeyer, Beth McCollum, Charles W. Cronkhite – strings
Bob Jenkins – oboe
John Boden – horn

References

1981 albums
4
American Gramaphone albums